Alexis Arias may refer to:
Alexis Arias (rower) (born 1969), Cuban rower
Alexis Arias (footballer) (born 1995), Peruvian footballer

See also:
Alexis Martín Arias (born 1992), Argentine footballer